Paul Marius Martin (6 June 1940, Saint-Cloud, today Gdyel in Algeria) is a French Latinist and historian of ancient Rome. He was professor of Latin language and literature at the Paul Valéry University, Montpellier III. He is a specialist of the history of Roman Kingdom and Roman Republic, the historiography of the first centuries of Rome and of the Roman monarchical ideology.

Publications 
 L’idée de royauté à Rome (series "Miroir des Civilisations antiques", 1-2), volume I, De la Rome royale au consensus républicain, preface by Raymond Bloch, Clermont-Ferrand, Adosa, 1982, 410 p., 18 tableaux, 2 maps ; volume II, Haine de la royauté et séductions monarchiques (du IVe au principat augustéen), Clermont-Ferrand, Adosa, 1994, 510 p., 8 tableaux .
 La Campanie antique, des origines à l’éruption du Vésuve, Clermont-Ferrand, Adosa, 1985, 152 p. 
 44. Tuer César ! (series "La Mémoire des siècles"), Brussels, Complexe, 1988, 221 p.  (partially online).
 Antoine et Cléopâtre : la fin d'un rêve, Paris, Albin Michel, 1990  ; 2e éd., Brussels, Complexe (series "Historiques"), 1995, 285 p., 4 maps, 3 tableaux  (partially online).
 La Guerre des Gaules – La Guerre civile (series "Les Textes fondateurs"), Paris, Ellipses, 2000, 192 p. 
 Vercingétorix, le politique, le stratège, Paris, Perrin, 2000, 263 p.  ; 2nd edition augmented, Perrin, 2009 ; 3rd ed. poche (series "Tempus"), Perrin, 2013  (partially online).
 L’explication de texte latin aux concours (Agrégations - C.A.P.E.S - Chartes - E.N.S. / Lettres classiques, Lettres Modernes, Grammaire, Philosophie, Espagnol, Portugais), Paris, Ellipses, 1995, 212 p.

References

Bibliography 
 Olivier Devillers et Jean Meyers (éd.), Pouvoirs des hommes, pouvoir des mots, des Gracques à Trajan. Hommages au professeur Paul Marius Martin (« Bibliothèque d’Études classiques », 54), Louvain, Peeters, 2009, XXIV-624 p., avec une préface de Jacqueline Dangel présentant la carrière et l'œuvre de P. M. Martin et une bibliographie exhaustive de ses travaux.

External links 
 Site de l'université Paul-Valéry.
 Annuaire de l'Association des professeurs de langues anciennes de l'enseignement supérieur.

French Latinists
French scholars of Roman history
Officiers of the Ordre des Palmes Académiques
People from Oran Province
1940 births
Living people
People of French Algeria